Chintalapudi is a town municipality and mandal headquarters in Eluru District of the Indian state of Andhra Pradesh .

Demographics
Chintalapudi is located in Eluru district, Andhra Pradesh. It has population of 25952 of which 12438 are males while 13514 are females as per Population Census 2011. In Chintalapudi village population of children with age 0-6 is 2652. Average Sex Ratio of Chintalapudi village is 1087 which is higher than Andhra Pradesh state average of 993. Child Sex Ratio for the Chintalapudi as per census is 997, higher than Andhra Pradesh average of 939. Chintalapudi village has higher literacy rate compared to Andhra Pradesh. In 2011, its literacy rate was 78.08% compared to 67.02% of Andhra Pradesh.

Transport 
Eluru is the nearest city to Chintalapudi at a distance of 47 km. APSRTC runs busses from Eluru, Jangareddygudem and Sattupalli to bus station at Chintalapudi.

References 

Villages in Eluru district
Mandal headquarters in Eluru district